Picenze is a frazione of Barisciano, in the province of L'Aquila in the Abruzzo region of Italy, which includes the locality of San Martino, Villa di Mezzo and Petogna.

Earthquake April 6, 2009
The territory of Picenze was affected by the 2009 L'Aquila earthquake, Richter magnitude (ML) 5.9, occurred at a depth of about 10 km. There were no effects on people, but the architectural heritage has been severely compromised, with injuries and slumps.

External links
 Picenzeonline

Frazioni of the Province of L'Aquila
Barisciano